Juan Francisco Pacheco y Téllez-Girón, 4th Consort Duke of Uceda, (Madrid, Spain,  8 June 1649 – Vienna, Austria,  25 August 1718), was a Spanish noble, viceroy of Sicily and Spanish Ambassador in Rome.

Biography
He was the son of Alonso Melchor Téllez-Girón, from whom he inherited the title of 3rd Count of  La Puebla de Montalban, and Juana de Velasco, daughter of Bernardino Fernández de Velasco, 6th Duke of Frías.

He was Captain General of Galicia (1682–1686), Spanish Viceroy of Sicily (1689–1696) under king Charles II of Spain, Ambassador at Rome, Italy, under kings Charles II of Spain and Philip V of Spain, member of the Spanish State Council under king Philip V of Spain. He was also 1st Marquis of Menas Albas, Marquis of Belmonte, Chevalier of the French Order of the Holy Spirit and Grandee of Spain.

During his time as the Spanish Viceroy of Sicily he experienced the 1693 Sicily earthquake and launched several naval attacks on Alger, Tunis and Istanbul, which resulted in a decrease of the number of Ottoman raids on Sicily.

During the War of the Spanish Succession he first supported Philip V of Spain, but went over to the Austrians in 1710, and lived the last years of his life in Vienna.

He became there Knight of the Order of the Golden Fleece, Austrian Branch, and member of the Austrian Empire State Council of Charles VI, Holy Roman Emperor.
 
He married on 16 July 1677 with Isabel María de Sandoval y Girón, a Grandee of Spain, 4th proprietary Duchess of Uceda, (born Madrid, Spain, 15 August 1653 – married 16 July 1677 - +Genoa, Italy,  23 July 1711).

Through this marriage Juan became jure uxoris, 4th Consort Duke of Uceda.

On the title Duke of Uceda 
 
Duchess Isabel María de Sandoval y Girón used for this name a practice used by women of the High Spanish Nobility and the ecclesiastic officers from such families since the middle of the 14th century, namely, that her mother was the 3rd proprietary Duchess of Uceda, a Grandee of Spain and describing herself as Feliche de Sandoval Ursino, or Feliche de Sandoval Orsini, (Madrid, Spain, 3 June 1625 - married 1645 - Milan, Italy, 7 October 1671)  while her father was, jure uxoris, and since marrying her in 1645  3rd Duke Consort of Uceda, albeit being known also as  Gaspar Téllez-Girón y Sandoval, 5th Duke of Osuna, (Madrid, 25 May 1625 - married 1645 - 2 June 1694).

In other words, the 3rd and the 4th Ducal titles associated to the Dukedom of Uceda were held in property by two women, Feliche de Sandoval and Isabel Maria de Sandoval, while their fathers/husbands however, were respectively named  "Alvarez de Toledo", (8th Count of Oropesa), "Pacheco Téllez-Girón", (3rd Count of La Puebla de Montalban) and "Tellez-Giron y Sandoval", (5th Duke of Osuna).

It is through this elaborate but by no means at the time uncommon, "family names engineering" that it was possible to pass on the family name "Sandoval" from Francisco Gómez de Sandoval, 1st Duke of Lerma, (PM of Spain under earlier king Philip III of Spain to their son:

Manuel de Sandoval Téllez-Girón, 5th Duke of Uceda,  (Madrid, Spain 11 April 1676 – Madrid, Spain, 12 November 1732).

References

Notes

Margarita MARTIN VELASCO . "La documentación histórica y la publicística del siglo XVIII. El IV Duque de Uceda y sy correspondencia con Félix de la Cruz Aedo". (2005). Rev. "Documentación de las Ciencias de la Información", (2006), vol 29, Pages 141-164.
Miguel Angel OCHOA BRUN . "Embajadas reales: La presencia diplomática española en Italia durante la Guerra de Sucesión", 15 Diciembre 2002, discurso leido en su recepcion como miembro de la Academia Española de la Historia.
Gregorio DE ANDRES . "Catalogo de los manuscritos de la Biblioteca del Duque de Uceda", Rev. Archivos, Bibliotecas y Museos, (1975), vol 78, pages 5–40.
K. KAMEN. "La Guerra de Sucesion en España, 1700 - 1715". Barcelona, Ed. Grijalbo, (1974).

1653 births
1711 deaths
Dukes of Uceda
Captain Generals of Galicia
Viceroys of Sicily
War of the Spanish Succession